Hesar-e Amir (also Romanized as Ḩeşār-e Amīr, Ḩeşār Amīr, and Ḩeşārāmīr) is a village in Hesar-e Amir Rural District, in the Central District of Pakdasht County, Tehran Province, Iran. At the 2006 census, its population was 25,281, in 6,072 families.

References 

Populated places in Pakdasht County